Brigitte Sansoucy is a Canadian politician who was elected as a Member of Parliament in the House of Commons of Canada to represent the federal electoral district Saint-Hyacinthe—Bagot during the 2015 Canadian federal election and served until she was defeated in 2019.

Prior to her election, she was a municipal councillor in the city of Saint-Hyacinthe and also was an Advisor to the Quebec Ministry of Agriculture, Fisheries and Food.

Biography
Brigitte Sansoucy holds a bachelor's degree in business administration as well as a master's degree in public administration from the École nationale d'administration publique. Until 2015, she was the Advisor and Deputy Regional Director of Development of the East Montérégie in the Department of Agriculture, Fisheries and Food of Quebec.

From 1996 to 2009, she ran a shelter for youth in distress, the Auberge du Coeur Le Baluchon, located in Saint-Hyacinthe.

Political career 
Sansoucy was first the New Democratic Party candidate during a by-election in 2007 in the riding of Saint-Hyacinthe—Bagot. During this election, she finished third with about 8% of the votes. In the 2008 Canadian federal election she finished again in third place. Also that year, she became national vice president of the NDP, being reconfirmed in this position in 2011 and 2013. She was a municipal councillor in the town of Saint-Hyacinthe from 2009 up until her election to the Canadian House of Commons in 2015; she was election in the municipal elections of 2009 and re-elected in 2013.

In the 2011 federal election, Sansoucy was not a candidate, but the riding was won by New Democrat candidate Marie-Claude Morin. When Morin made the decision in 2014 not to stand for re-election, Sansoucy was asked to run. She officially became a candidate in December 2014 and was elected to Ottawa as a Member of Parliament on October 19, 2015.

During her term, she was critic for her party for employment and social development as well as in infrastructure and communities. She was also Vice-Chair of the Standing Committee on Human Resources, Skills Development, Social Development and the Status of Persons with Disabilities.

In February 2016, Sansoucy introduced Bill C-245, An Act concerning the development of a national poverty reduction strategy in Canada. The bill was defeated at second reading by a vote of 52 For and 238 Against.

In the 2019 federal election, Brigitte Sansoucy was defeated by Bloc Québécois candidate Simon-Pierre Savard-Tremblay.

Electoral record

Federal

Municipal

References

Living people
New Democratic Party MPs
Members of the House of Commons of Canada from Quebec
Women members of the House of Commons of Canada
Place of birth missing (living people)
Quebec municipal councillors
Women in Quebec politics
Quebec civil servants
People from Saint-Hyacinthe
21st-century Canadian politicians
21st-century Canadian women politicians
1963 births